Central Mountain Air Ltd. is a Canadian regional airline based in Smithers, British Columbia. It operates scheduled, charter, and transborder services. Its main base is Smithers Airport, with other bases at Calgary International Airport and Vancouver International Airport.

History 
The airline was established and started operations in 1987; it is wholly owned by 580741 BC. In 1997 Central Mountain Air placed an order for additional Raytheon Beech 1900D Airliner aircraft and began operating as an Air Canada connector, replacing Air BC operating several routes within Alberta and British Columbia, latterly under the Air Canada Express banner. In October 2011, Central Mountain Air ceased its Capacity Purchase Agreement (CPA) with Air Canada. The agreement had been for flights from Calgary to Lethbridge, Medicine Hat and Cranbrook. Central Mountain Air continues to be an Air Canada codeshare partner for flights from Vancouver to Campbell River, Quesnel, and Williams Lake.

In late 2005, the first of two Dornier 328 were delivered to the airline, for use on chartered and scheduled flights. In 2014 they received their third Dornier 328. In March 2010, 580741 BC, the parent company of Central Mountain Air, purchased fellow British Columbia-based airline Hawkair. On November 18, 2016, Hawkair declared bankruptcy, had all assets seized for liquidation, and permanently suspended operations.

Central Mountain Air is the sister company of Northern Thunderbird Air, which operates charter and cargo services from Prince George.

Destinations 

Central Mountain Air operates services to the following domestic scheduled destinations (as of October 2022):
 British Columbia
 Campbell River (Campbell River Airport)
 Fort Nelson (Fort Nelson Airport)
 Kelowna (Kelowna International Airport)
 Prince George (Prince George Airport)
 Quesnel (Quesnel Airport)
 Smithers (Smithers Airport)
 Terrace-Kitimat (Northwest Regional Airport Terrace-Kitimat)
 Vancouver (Vancouver International Airport)
 Williams Lake (Williams Lake Airport)
 Alberta
 Edmonton (Edmonton International Airport)
 High Level (High Level Airport)

Fleet 
As of August 2022, the Central Mountain Air fleet includes the following aircraft:

References

External links

 Official website
 FlightSource.ca photos of CMA Aircraft
 Smithers Chamber of Commerce / Central Mountain Air

Airlines established in 1987
Regional airlines of British Columbia
Smithers, British Columbia
1987 establishments in British Columbia
Canadian companies established in 1987